Charter School Associates (CSA) is a charter school operator headquartered in Sunrise, Florida. It is led by Michael Strader.

Schools
 Advantage Academy of Hillsborough in Plant City 
 Bell Creek Academy in Riverview, Florida
 Channelside Academy of Math and Science 
 Everglades Preparatory Academy 
 Hillsborough Academy of Math and Science 
 Palm Glades Academy 
 Pemayetv Emahakv Middle 
 Pemayetv Emahakv Our Way Charter School 
Pinellas Academy of Math and Science
 Santa Fe Advantage Academy 
 Shiloh Charter School in Plant City
 Summerville Advantage Academy 
 The Charter School at Waterstone 
 Valrico Lake Advantage Academy 
 Viera Charter School
 West Broward Academy

References

Charter schools in Florida